Sevilla Linces (Seville Lynxes in English language) is an American football team based in Seville, Andalusia (Spain).

History
The team has an interesting history as they were founded by three fans (Antonio Cornejo Dueñas, Santiago Vega García and Basilio Parrado Parrado ) brought together by an advertisement published in a football magazine called 100 yards asking for people to play football for fun. After playing at local parks, decision was taken to join official competition.

After a friendly game against Cádiz Corsarios played on May 14, 1993, which was the first ever football game in Andalusia, they joined the Spanish second division.

In 1999 the team finally promoted to the elite league in Spain, the LNFA, where they have been competing since.

Current roster

Notable coaches
 Alfonso Genchi (1993)
 David González (2000)
 J.A. "Fali" Ascasibar (2004)
 Jose Luis Corrochano (2007)
 Antonio Laguna (2009)
 Sergio Gonzalez (2010)
 Orlando Pantoja (2011)
 Raúl Laguna (2012)
 Antonio Garrido (2012)

Notable players

Spanish players
 Manuel Fernandez Gomez, All-Spain Team,(1994).
 Antonio Laguna, All-Spain Team, (2003).
 Sergio Forte, All-Spain Team(2003).
 Antonio Ferro, Junior All-Spain Team (2004).
 Alexis Harrelson, Junior All-Spain Team (2006).
 Antonio Coleman, Junior All-Spain Team (2008).
 Jairo Camacho, Junior All-Spain Team (2010).
 Juan Carlos Garcia, Junior All-Spain Team (2010).

International Players
 Cameron Scripture, former Gustavus Adolphus Golden Gusties player (2000).
 Alejandro Garay, former ITESM CCM Borregos Salvajes player (2001).
 Gerardo Torrado, former UDLA Aztecas player (2001).
 Manuel Herrera, former UDLA Aztecas player (2001).
 Ezra Valencia, former  UDLA Aztecas player (2002).
 Oscar Vaca, former CGP Centinelas player (2002).
 Sean Michael Moore, former Princeton Tigers player (2002).
 Andre Warner, former Hopkins School Hilltoppers player (2003).
 Marco Mantovani, former Ferrara Aquile player (2003).
 Michele Ventorre, former Ferrara Aquile player (2003).
 Jorge Sanchez, former UDLA Aztecas player (2005).
 Mark Pituch, former Grinnell Pioneers player (2005).
 Matteo Bigliardi, former Bologna Warriors player (2005).
 Paolo Arcilesi, former Palermo Corsari player (2005).
 Thomas Griette, former La Courneuve Flash player (2005).
 Pablo Hernandez, former Naucalpan Perros Negros player (2006).
 Ryan Crawford, former Oakwood High School, Dayton Ohio player (2006).
 Edward Ramirez, former Valley Highschool, Las Vegas player (2007).
 Colten Crist, former Smithson Valley HS Rangers player (2008).
 Ryan Baxter, former Highland Park HS Scots player (2008).
 Alex Garfio, former UC Davis Aggies player (2009).
 Cameron Martin, former Millard North HS Mustangs player (2009).
 Sergio Gonzalez, former UDLA Aztecas player (2009)
 Ricky Koon, St. Louis (2010)
 Ulises (ElChingon) Rafael Escamilla Peña, former St. Joseph Academy Bloodhounds player (1994)

External links
Official website

American football teams in Spain
Sport in Seville
American football teams established in 1992
Sports teams in Andalusia